Bâgé-Dommartin is a commune in the Ain department of eastern France. The municipality was established on January 1, 2018 and consists of the former communes of Bâgé-la-Ville and Dommartin.

Population

See also 
Communes of the Ain department

References 

Communes of Ain
Communes nouvelles of Ain
2018 establishments in France
Populated places established in 2018
Bresse
Ain communes articles needing translation from French Wikipedia